Dave Gilbert (born 15 August 1961) is a former professional snooker player.

Gilbert defeated Cliff Wilson on the way to the last 16 of the 1987 International Open before losing to Stephen Hendry.

He reached the last 32 of both the 1988 and 1989 English professional championship losing to Dean Reynolds and Joe Johnson, respectively. 

He beat Dennis Taylor to reach the last 32 of the 1989 Asian Open.

In 1986 and 1989 Gilbert lost in the final round of qualifying before the Crucible Theatre section of the Snooker World Championship, losing to Dave Martin and then Doug Mountjoy.

Ken Owers won the 1989 WPBSA Invitational Event Two, beating Gilbert 9–6 in the final.

In January 1977, Patsy Fagan hit the first maximum of his career, against Gilbert at the Clapton Bus Garage Social Club.

References

Living people
1961 births
English snooker players